The Radne Raket 120 is a lightweight single cylinder, two-stroke aircraft engine used for powered hang gliders, paramotors and ultralight aircraft that is built by Radne Motor AB of Haninge, Sweden.

Design and development
The Raket 120 features electronic ignition and a Walbro carburetor. It weighs  and, due to its 13,000 rpm redline usually drives a propeller through a 3.6:1 reduction drive. The engine is equipped with a centrifugal clutch to allow running the engine without turning the propeller.

Variants
Raket 120 Aero
Model with recoil starter.
Raket 120 Aero ES
Model with electric starter.

Applications

Specifications (Raket 120 Aero)

References

External links
Official website

Air-cooled aircraft piston engines
Two-stroke aircraft piston engines